Diplecogaster is a genus of fish in the family Gobiesocidae found in Black Sea, Mediterranean Sea and Atlantic Ocean.

Species
There are currently 7 recognized species in this genus:
 Diplecogaster bimaculata (Bonnaterre, 1788) (Two-spotted clingfish)
 Diplecogaster ctenocrypta Briggs, 1955 (Eastern Atlantic deep-water clingfish) 
 Diplecogaster euxinica Murgoci, 1964 
 Diplecogaster megalops Briggs, 1955 (Big-eye clingfish)
 Diplecogaster pectoralis Briggs, 1955 
 Diplecogaster tonstricula R. Fricke, Wirtz & Brito, 2015 (Eastern Atlantic cleaner clingfish) 
 Diplecogaster umutturali Bilecenoğlu, Yokeş & Kovačić, 2017

References

 
Gobiesocidae
Taxa named by Alec Fraser-Brunner
Marine fish genera
Ray-finned fish genera